Steven Parrino (1958–2005) was an American artist and musician associated with energetic punk nihilism. He is best known for creating big modernist monochrome paintings (his colors were limited to monochrome black (or black-and-white), orange, red, blue, and silver) that he violently slashed, torn or twisted off their stretchers. He died in a motorcycle traffic accident in Greenpoint, Brooklyn at the age of 46.

Art work
Parrino was born in New York City in 1958 and grew up on Long Island. The family was Albanian-Arbëreshë originally from Sicily. He earned an associate of applied science degree from SUNY Farmingdale in 1979 and a bachelor of fine arts degree from Parsons The New School for Design in 1982.

Parrino began producing art at the end of the 1970s.  His oeuvre includes paintings, sculpture collage and drawings. He was driven, as he said himself, by his ‘necrophiliac interest’ in painting, which at that time had been pronounced dead. As early as 1981 he detached the canvas from the stretcher in places to create rough, folded, cleft surfaces, thus achieving a literal deconstruction of painting.

Parrino first showed his paintings of deep-seated pessimism at Gallery Nature Morte, an East Village gallery, in 1984, when he emerged as part of a strain of postmodernism called Neo-Geo post-conceptual art. The idea of neo-conceptual art (sometimes later termed post-conceptual art) was clearly articulated for Parrino by Tricia Collins and Richard Milazzo in the early 1980s when they brought to prominence a whole new generation of artists through their copious writings and curatorial activity. It was their exhibitions and writings that originally fashioned the theoretical context for Parrino's new kind of neo (or post) conceptual art; one that argued simultaneously against Neo-Expressionism and The Pictures Generation. It was through this context that the work of many of the artists associated with Neo-Conceptualism (or what some of the critics reductively called Simulationism and Neo Geo) was first brought together: artists such as Parrino, Ross Bleckner, James Welling, Richard Prince, Peter Nagy, Joseph Nechvatal, Sarah Charlesworth, Mark Innerst, Allan McCollum, Peter Halley, Jonathan Lasker, Haim Steinbach, Philip Taaffe, Robert Gober and Saint Clair Cemin. Within this context Parrino called his mauled canvases misshaped paintings, in response to the shaped paintings of the sixties.

In addition to painting, Parrino exhibited painted environments that involved monochrome walls pounded with sledgehammers such as the 13 plaster panels painted black and smashed to pieces as a memorial to the Punk legend Joey Ramone called 13 Shattered Panels for Joey Ramone (2001). He also made films of the making of these environments along with sleek metal sculptures whose bent and folded elements related to his misshaped canvases. He also exhibited photographs of his desktop strewn with the newspaper stories, magazine spreads and music albums that often inspired him. Parrino used intentionally provocative subjects like abstract swastikas, rebel flags, and silhouettes of Russ Meyer starlets, Elvis Presley as rendered by Andy Warhol, the Hells Angels, Johnny Cash, and other works by Andy Warhol. His work has been called "mannered, Romantic, formulaic, conceptualist-formalist heavy-metal boy-art abstraction" by the art critic Jerry Saltz.

Noise music
Parrino also played electric guitar in several downtown bands, most recently Electrophilia, a two-person group he formed with the painter and keyboardist Jutta Koether.

In 1999, a CD titled Electrophilia – Live France 1999 was released by the Consortium in Dijon, France. It is a live recording from two noise music concerts that Parrino gave: one at La Chapelle, École Nationale des Beaux-Arts in Bourges on March 24, 1999 and the other at the Consortium in Dijon on March 26, 1999. Also an LP of his audio work was released in 2002 titled Steven Parrino - Electrophilia / Shock Wave Troop (2002) that had three pieces on it: Helen Fordsdale, Eulogy For Dead Jerks and Shock Wave Troop. It is a 10-inch LP that was released in an edition of 400 by Circuit in Lausanne, Switzerland.

Several videos document Parrino as a performer and the central role played by music in his life and work. In a noise music work titled Guitar Grind (1995), he rubbed his bass up against a guitar, causing the two instruments to scream through the amplifiers.

Parrino did the cover art for Tellus Audio Cassette Magazine #20 titled Media Myth (1988), for The Melvins LP It Tastes Better Than the Truth (2003) and for Thurston Moore's CD Demolished Thoughts (2011).

Black Noise book
A book titled Black Noise – A Tribute to Steven Parrino was released by RP-Ringier in 2007. It was made up of a series of 32 artist books in a boxset, in the comic book format, conceived in tribute to the late Steven Parrino. 250 copies limited edition. Each volume was signed by a different artist, linked in some way to Steven Parrino, by projects and exchanges, by friendship, by reciprocal inspiration.

The No Texts book
A 56-page book of Steven Parrino's art theory writings, edited by Lionel Bovier, titled  The No Texts: An anthology of writings was released by Abaton Book Company in 2003.

Reception
Until his death, Parrino's work had drawn little attention in the United States. He had nine solo shows in New York (the last ones at the Swiss Institute in 2002 and at Team Gallery in 2004) and showed widely in galleries and museum in Europe, where his work was more widely appreciated than in the United States.

Following his death, Parrino's work has been included in the Whitney Biennial 2006: Day for Night, Whitney Museum of American Art (2006), The Painted World, P.S.1 Contemporary Art Center (2005), and The Indiscipline of Painting Tate St. Ives touring to Warwick Art Centre (2011/12). Solo exhibitions of his work have included the Musée d'Art Moderne et Contemporain in Geneva (2006) and the Palais de Tokyo in Paris (2007). His estate is represented by Gagosian Gallery.

Footnotes

References
 Steven Parrino,The No Texts: An anthology of writings, Abaton Book Company, 2003 
 Carlo McCormick, The Downtown Book: The New York Art Scene, 1974–1984, Princeton University Press, 2006

20th-century American painters
American male painters
21st-century American painters
21st-century American male artists
Postmodern artists
Painters from New York City
1958 births
American sound artists
American experimental musicians
American people of Arbëreshë descent
American noise musicians
2005 deaths
20th-century American musicians
American people of Albanian descent
Post-conceptual artists
20th-century American male artists
Road incident deaths in New York City